Henry Benton Sayler (January 16, 1921 – May 26, 2021) was an American politician in the state of Florida who served as a Member of the Florida Senate from 1967 to 1971 and again from 1973 to 1978.

Sayler was born in Georgia in January 1921, and moved to Florida in 1941. He attended the United States Military Academy where he attained a Bachelor of Science degree in 1943. He also served in World War II in the US Army Air Forces. Sayler served in the Florida State Senate from 1967 to 1971 and 1973 to 1978, as a member of the Republican Party (20th district and 21st district). Sayler married Wyline Chapman in 1947. She predeceased him in July 2020, aged 95. Sayler turned 100 in January 2021 and died in May.

References

1921 births
2021 deaths
American centenarians
Republican Party Florida state senators
Men centenarians
Military personnel from Florida
Politicians from Savannah, Georgia
United States Army Air Forces personnel of World War II
United States Military Academy alumni